79 Ceti, also known as HD 16141, is a binary star system located 123 light-years from the Sun in the southern constellation of Cetus. It has an apparent visual magnitude of +6.83, which puts it below the normal limit for visibility with the average naked eye. The star is drifting closer to the Earth with a heliocentric radial velocity of −51 km/s.

Harlan (1974) assigned this star a stellar classification of G2V, matching an ordinary G-type main-sequence star that is undergoing core hydrogen fusion. However, Houk and Swift (1999) found a class of G8IV, which suggests it has exhausted the supply of hydrogen at its core and begun to evolve off the main sequence. Eventually the outer layers of the star will expand and cool and the star will become a red giant. Estimates of the star's age range from 6.0 to 9.4 billion years old. It has an estimated 1.06 times the mass of the Sun and 1.48 times the Sun's radius. The star is radiating twice luminosity of the Sun from its photosphere at an effective temperature of 5,806 K. The discrepancy was later found to be due to an additional red dwarf star in the system at a projected separation 220 AUs.

Planetary system
On March 29, 2000, a planet orbiting primary star was announced, it was discovered using the radial velocity method. This object has a minimum 0.26 times the mass of Jupiter and is orbiting its host star every 75.5 days.

See also
 81 Ceti
 94 Ceti
 Lists of exoplanets

References

External links
 SIMBAD: HD 16141 -- High proper-motion Star
 SolStation: 79 Ceti
 Extrasolar Planets Encyclopaedia: HD 16141

G-type subgiants
G-type main-sequence stars
Planetary systems with one confirmed planet
Cetus (constellation)
Durchmusterung objects
Ceti, 79
9085
016141
012048
J02351994-0333376